I Like the Way may refer to:

 "I Like the Way" (BodyRockers song), 2005
 "I Like the Way" (Deni Hines song), 1996
 "I Like the Way (The Kissing Game)", a 1991 song by Hi-Five

See also
 "(I Like) The Way You Love Me", a 2011 song by Michael Jackson